The Hudson–Athens Lighthouse, sometimes called the Hudson City light, is a lighthouse located in the Hudson River in the state of New York in the United States. The light is located between Hudson and Athens, closer to the Hudson side. Constructed in 1874, it marks a sandy ridge known as Middle Ground Flats and also acts as a general aid to navigation of the river. The station is built on a granite caisson with a unique shape designed to protect it from ice floes and river debris. The dwelling is constructed in the Second Empire architectural style,
with a mansard roof. It is considered to be virtually a twin of the Stepping Stones Light in Long Island Sound, which was constructed just a few years later.

History 
The station's beacon was originally lighted by Henry D. Best, the station's first lightkeeper, on November 14, 1874. It was upgraded to a fifth-order Fresnel lens in 1926, and the station was fully automated on  November 10, 1949. In 1967, the Hudson River Valley Commission, led by Nelson A. Rockefeller, suggested that certain lighthouses owned by the United States Coast Guard be turned over to not-for-profit historical groups to ensure their preservation and upkeep. Hudson–Athens was the first station to be tried through such a program, and on February 15, 1984, a 20-year lease was signed between the Coast Guard and the Hudson–Athens Lighthouse Preservation Society (HALPS). In 2000, title to the station was turned over permanently to HALPS. Today, the Preservation Society conducts occasional tours of the station, which is being restored to its condition as it would have been in the 1930s.

The Lighthouse was documented by the Historic American Buildings Survey (HABS) as survey number NY-6286. There are 9 architectural drawings available in the survey.

The Hudson–Athens Lighthouse is shown on the NOAA Chart 12347.

Chronology 
Chronology from USCG web site
 1872:  Congress of U.S. approves $35,000.00 to build the lighthouse.
 1873–1874:  Lighthouse was constructed.
 1874, November 14:  Lighthouse was put into operation with Henry D. Best as the first keeper.
 1949, November 10:  The lighthouse was automated.
 1940s:  Electricity was installed.
 1967:  Nelson A. Rockefeller established the Hudson River Valley Commission, which suggested the USCG deed over or lease lighthouse facilities to public or not-for-profit groups for maintenance and preservation.
 1982:  Hudson–Athens Lighthouse Preservation Society was formed.
 February 15, 1984:  A 20-year lease between the Lighthouse Preservation Society and the USCG was signed.  This was the first lease of its kind.
 2002:  Occasional tours are available to the public through the Lighthouse Preservation Society

Cultural 
The Archives Center at the Smithsonian National Museum of American History has a collection (#1055) of souvenir postcards of lighthouses and has digitized 272 of these and made them available online.  These include postcards of Hudson–Athens Light with links to customized nautical charts provided by National Oceanographic and Atmospheric Administration.

The Hudson–Athens Lighthouse is featured in the book Curious Constructions – A Peculiar Portfolio Of Fifty Fascinating Structures by Michael Hearst.

References

External links 
 
 Official site of the Hudson–Athens Lighthouse Preservation Society
 Lighthousefriends.com page on the Hudson–Athens Light
 
 U.S. National Park Service page on Hudson–Athens
 Coast Guard list of Lighthouses
 Coast Guard list of assets
 Hudson Lights
 National Park Service's Maritime Heritage Program's Inventory of Historic Light Stations
 National Park Service's Maritime Heritage Program's Inventory of NY Historic Light Stations

Lighthouses completed in 1874
Houses completed in 1874
Lighthouses on the National Register of Historic Places in New York (state)
Historic American Buildings Survey in New York (state)
Hudson, New York
Hudson River
Transportation buildings and structures in Columbia County, New York
National Register of Historic Places in Columbia County, New York